Luis Saavedra (22 June 1935 – 8 December 2013) was a Spanish footballer who primarily played as a left-sided defender and midfielder.

Saavedra died on 8 December 2013, aged 78.

References

1935 births
2013 deaths
People from San Cristóbal de La Laguna
Sportspeople from the Province of Santa Cruz de Tenerife
Spanish footballers
Association football defenders
Association football midfielders